Cadet is an unincorporated community in Union Township in eastern Washington County, Missouri, United States. Cadet is located on Missouri Route 47 between Old Mines to the west and Bonne Terre to the southeast.

History
Cadet is situated in the middle of the old lead and barite mining region of Washington County, and is said to have had the last log and ash furnace in the area, still in use in 1864. Cadet had its start when the railroad was extended to that point. A post office called Cadet has been in operation since 1859.  It is unknown why the name "Cadet" was applied to this community.

The town had a population of about 500 when it was struck by a historic tornado, three quarters of a mile wide, which levelled most of the buildings on 14 Apr 1911. Including the residents of the surrounding farms, about three thousand people were left homeless, twelve injured and four dead.

References

Unincorporated communities in Washington County, Missouri
Unincorporated communities in Missouri